Simona Molinari (born 23 February 1983) is an Italian jazz music singer. She performed at the Sanremo Music Festival 2009 her song "Egocentrica". Shortly after, she released the album of the same name.

Discography

Studio albums
 Egocentrica (2009)- ITA No. 75
 Croce e delizia (2010)
 Tua (2011) – ITA No. 29
 Dr.Jekill, Mr. Hyde (2013) – ITA No. 16

Singles
 2009 – "Egocentrica"
 2009 – "Nell'aria"
 2010 – "Amore a prima vista" (feat. Ornella Vanoni) – ITA No. 10
 2011 – "Forse" (feat. Danny Diaz) – ITA No. 34
 2011 – "In cerca di te" (feat. Peter Cincotti) – ITA No. 25
 2013 – "La felicità" – ITA No. 14
 2013 – "Dr.Jekill, Mr. Hyde"

Awards and nominations

References

External links
Simona Molinari at Myspace

Musicians from Naples
1983 births
Italian pop singers
Living people
21st-century Italian singers
21st-century Italian women singers
Italian jazz singers
Women pop singers
Women jazz singers